Enamengal, also known as Enamenga or Enam-Ngal, is a village in Cameroon. It is located within the municipality of Zoétélé of the Dja-et-Lobo department, South Region. It had a population of 151 in 2005.

Demographics 
In 1962, when it was part of French Cameroun, it had a population of 92, mostly members of the Fong ethnic group.

In the 2005 Cameroon Census, there were 151 people living in Enamengal.

Notable people 
The Jesuit theologian and artist Engelbert Mveng was born in Enamengal.

See also
Communes of Cameroon

References 

South Region (Cameroon)